Nedlands Rugby Union Football Club, often referred to as Neddies, is a rugby union club based in Nedlands, Western Australia, with several teams competing in the local RugbyWA competitions including the RugbyWA Fortescue Premier Grade.

The club, established in 1934, trains and plays its home games at Charles Court Reserve located on the banks of the Swan River in Nedlands. The club has a large function centre and licensed bar facility which overlooks the rugby grounds.

Coaches
Nedlands' head coach for 2019 in Premier Grade is Sam Rarasea, a former Nedlands Premier Grade player. Assisting him is Will Brock as reserve grade head coach with Mason Pomare and Mike Botes assistant coaches. Tom Fearn is coaching mentor for seniors and juniors.

Honours

 Premier Grade (18)
 1940, 1957, 1970, 1973, 1978, 1980, 1981, 1986, 1989, 1990, 1993, 1994, 1995, 1999, 2000, 2010, 2013, 2015

Notable members
Nedlands players to have gained international caps include:
Pek Cowan – Wallabies (2009-2010)
Nicky Tyrone Little – Fiji (1996-2011)
Tohoa Tauroa (Paul) Koteka – All Blacks (1981–82)
Geoff Valli – All Blacks (1980)
Murray Watts – All Blacks (1979–80)
Spencer Brown – Wallabies (1952–53)
Yogi - (MBC 2009-2011)

See also
 RugbyWA
 City of Nedlands

References

External links
Nedlands Rugby official website

Rugby union teams in Western Australia
Rugby clubs established in 1934
1934 establishments in Australia
Nedlands, Western Australia